The Russian Open in badminton was an international open held in Russia since 1993. This  tournament is the continuation of the USSR International. In 2007 it became a BWF Grand Prix Gold.

After the 2022 Russian invasion of Ukraine, the Badminton World Federation (BWF) cancelled all BWF tournaments in Russia.

Previous winners

Performances by nation

Note

References

External links
2007

 
Badminton tournaments in Russia
Recurring sporting events established in 1993
1993 establishments in Russia